Symon is both a surname and given name. Notable people with the name include:

Surname
 Don Symon (born 1960), New Zealand Olympic rower
 Jim Symon, Scottish radio presenter
 Josiah Symon (1846–1934), Scottish-Australian lawyer and politician
 Keith Symon (born 1920), American physicist
 Michael Symon (born 1969), American restaurant and television chef
 Mike Symon (born 1969), Australian politician from Deakin; Parliament member since 2007
 Paul Symon (born 1960), senior officer in the Australian Army
 Peter Symon, Australian politician 
 Scot Symon (1911–1985), Scottish professional football manager
 Vanda Symon (born 1969), New Zealand crime writer and radio host

Given name
 Symon Budny (c. 1530–1593), Polish-Belarusian humanist, educator, philosopher, sociologist and historian
 Symon Banda (1995-present),peer educator, food scientist, SRH Volunteer, from Thunga(Thyolo), Malawi
 Symon Gould (died 1963), American Vegetarian Party founder
 Symon Hill, British activist and journalist
 Symon Petliura (1879–1926), Ukrainian politician, statesman, writer, and journalist 
 Symon Sadik Bangladeshi film actor
 Symon Semeonis, 14th-century Irish Franciscan friar and author

See also
 Symons
 Simon (disambiguation)
 Simons

Ukrainian masculine given names
Surnames from given names